In geometric topology, the de Rham invariant is a mod 2 invariant of a (4k+1)-dimensional manifold, that is, an element of  – either 0 or 1. It can be thought of as the simply-connected symmetric L-group  and thus analogous to the other invariants from L-theory: the signature, a 4k-dimensional invariant (either symmetric or quadratic), and the Kervaire invariant, a (4k+2)-dimensional quadratic invariant 

It is named for Swiss mathematician Georges de Rham, and used in surgery theory.

Definition 
The de Rham invariant of a (4k+1)-dimensional manifold can be defined in various equivalent ways:
 the Stiefel–Whitney number ;
 in terms of a semicharacteristic.

References 

 
 Chess, Daniel, A Poincaré-Hopf type theorem for the de Rham invariant, 1980

Geometric topology
Surgery theory